The UAAP Season 66 men's basketball tournament refers to the men's basketball tournament of UAAP Season 66 (2003–04 season) of the University Athletic Association of the Philippines (UAAP). The tournament was hosted by Ateneo de Manila University. ABS-CBN covered the games on Studio 23.

After a UAAP Board decision that upheld the UE Red Warriors' protest against the De La Salle Green Archers, three teams ended tied for first after the elimination round. By virtue of having the superior point differential from games among the tied teams, the defending champions Ateneo Blue Eagles secured the #1 seed; the FEU Tamaraws defeated UE in the second-seed playoff in a virtual game one of a best-of-3 series. Ateneo needed their twice-to-beat advantage to outlast La Salle in a fight-marred series to advance to the Finals, while FEU needed one game to eliminate a stubborn UE team. In the Finals, FEU coach Koy Banal led the team to victory over a tired Ateneo team coached by his brother Joel to win FEU's first UAAP men's basketball championship since 1997.

UE's James Yap was named Most Valuable Player (MVP) of the season. Arwind Santos was named Finals MVP.

Elimination round

Match-up results

Scores
Results on top and to the right of the dashes are for first-round games; those to the bottom and to the left of it are second-round games.

Second seed playoff
Since Ateneo, FEU and UE finished the eliminations with identical 11-3 cards, the quotient system was used. Ateneo emerged with the best quotient among the three, so UE and FEU figured out for a playoff game for the second seed to determine which team will clinch the twice-to-beat advantage that goes along with it, leading to a de facto first game of a best-of-three series. The winner only has to win once in the series, while the loser have to win twice to qualify for the Finals.

UE fell behind by as much as 18 points in the fourth quarter, but caught up with FEU due to their trapping defense. Olan Omiping hit a shot to start a 21–4 UE run, that was ended by RJ Masbang when he scored on a three-point play to cut FEU's lead to one point. Denok Miranda and Mark Isip initiated a 5–0 FEU run when UE coach Boyzie Zamar benched Masbang for shooter Charles Tan, who turned the ball over and fouled Santos that caused a three-point play to put FEU up by eight points. Up by three points, Santos tipped-in a Miranda miss to seal the win for FEU and the #2 seed.

Bracket
*Number of asterisks denotes the number of overtime periods.

Semifinals
FEU and Ateneo have the twice-to-beat advantage. They only have to win once, while their opponents, twice, to progress.

FEU vs. UE

FEU and UE were locked in a close game until the final minutes. Paul Artadi scored a three-pointer to put the Red Warriors up 61–60. RJ Rizada and Gerald Jones scored baskets late in the game to eliminate the Red Warriors anew.

Ateneo vs. La Salle

Game 1

With former Chicago Bulls player Scott Burrell at court side, Ateneo led for much of the game; La Salle top scorer Mark Cardona was injured. La Salle's Joseph Yeo led the Archers back into the game; Jerwin Gaco scored on a put-back after a La Salle miss to force overtime. With 1:31 left in the overtime period, a bench-clearing brawl erupted after Gaco bumped LA Tenorio after a loose-ball scramble. Slo-mo replays later showed Tenorio sneaked in a punch to Gaco's side. After commissioner Joe Lipa and Araneta Coliseum personnel restored order, referees thrown out Ateneo's Magnum Membrere and La Salle's Ryan Araña. Yeo, who scored 31 points, and JV Casio led La Salle at the end of overtime to extend the series.

Game 2

After the fracas at their first semifinals game, Tenorio was suspended. This gave Macky Escalona Tenorio's starting point-guard spot. Cardona, who was dressed to play, was not fielded in by La Salle coach Franz Pumaren. At the end of the first half, a commotion broke out between the two teams in the Araneta Coliseum tunnel as they went to their respective locker rooms. At the stands, there were at least three incidents of shoving, punching and debris-throwing involving officials and supporters. Lipa ordered a certain fan to be expelled after having a word war with the Ateneo supporters. Midway through the third quarter, Ateneo led 47–33 but La Salle crept up. At the fourth quarter, as Ateneo's shot clock was running out, center Paolo Bugia made an improbable three-pointer to pad their lead 63–59. Larry Fonacier scored six straight points in the final 61 seconds to put Ateneo up for good; after Joseph Yeo scored on a three-pointer to cut Ateneo's lead 71–68, Fonacier made two free-throws off Cabatu's unsportsmanlike foul to put them up by five points. A last-ditch foul from Casio on Macky Escalona settled the final score as Escalona split his free-throws.

At the end of the game, another scuffle between the supporters broke out, and included former Ateneo players Enrico Villanueva, Rainier Sison and Andrew Cruz; both Sison and Cruz suffered bruises. Uniformed policemen, including the SWAT team, and Araneta Coliseum security guards restored order.

Finals
In the finals, defending champion Ateneo coach Joel Banal faced his brother, FEU coach Koy.

Game 1

Ateneo threatened to blow the game wide open in the first quarter, but FEU responded with defense that gave Ateneo few easy points. The Tamaraws grabbed rebounds that led into easy fast break points to cruise to an easy win to lead the best-of-3 series 1–0.

Game 2

Finals Most Valuable Player: 

FEU led for most of the game, with Cesar Catli, RJ Rizada and Rhagnee Singco scoring baskets to increase FEU's lead 39–26. Ateneo cut the lead 46–39 near the end of the third quarter thanks to Larry Fonacier's free-throws. However, Jeffrei Chan scored on a three-point shot to increase FEU's lead to ten to end the quarter. At the start of the fourth quarter, FEU led for good, 56–39, after a Gerald Jones shot. The Eagles threatened anew late in the fourth, but Dennis Miranda converted a three-point shot with 2:31 left to put the Eagles away, 63–50. FEU won their first UAAP men's basketball championship since 1997.

Broadcast notes

UAAP Final Four
September 25, 2003

September 30, 2003

UAAP Finals

Awards
The awards were given out prior to Game 2 at the Araneta Coliseum:
Most Valuable Player: 
Rookie of the Year: 
Mythical Five:

See also
NCAA Season 79 basketball tournaments

References

66
2003 in Philippine basketball
UAAP Season 66